Kaj may refer to:

Places in Iran
 Kaj, Chaharmahal and Bakhtiari
 Kaj, Hamadan
 Kaj, Isfahan
 Kaj, Qom
 Kaj, Razavi Khorasan
 Kaj, Sistan and Baluchestan

Other uses
 Kaj River, a river of Afghanistan
 Kaj (name)
 A fictional frog on the Danish TV series Kaj & Andrea
 Kaj, a conjunction in Esperanto

See also 
 KAJ (disambiguation)